Bailey's Hotel may refer to:

Millennium Bailey's Hotel, London -historic hotel in London established in 1876
Bailey Hotel, Louisiana, US
Hotel Bailey, Rome, Italy